Foucault is a 1986 book on the work of Michel Foucault by the philosopher Gilles Deleuze. Deleuze, like in his other works on major philosophers, thinks along with Foucault instead of trying to write a guide to his philosophy. The book focuses on the conceptual underpinnings of Foucault's extensive work by considering in depth two of his paradigmatic works, The Archaeology of Knowledge (1969) and Discipline and Punish (1975).

References

1986 non-fiction books
Books about Michel Foucault
French non-fiction books
Les Éditions de Minuit books
Works by Gilles Deleuze
University of Minnesota Press books